30 Seconds of Fame is the fourth studio album from the alternative/progressive rock band byron. Released on 16 March 2013 at Palatul Naţional al Copiilor in Bucharest. It's the first bilingual album in band's discography - there is a Romanian version called 30 de secunde de faimă.

Track listing

Personnel

byron
Dan Byron – vocals, acoustic guitar, flute, programming
Costin Oprea – electric guitar
6fingers – keyboards, backing vocals, glockenspiel
László Demeter - bass
Dan Georgescu - drums

Additional musicians
Luiza Zan - backing vocals 
Alexander Bălănescu – violin
Petre Ionuţescu – trumpet 
Mircea Mutulescu – oboe 
Mihai Boboescu – bassoon
Pablo Hopenhayn & Juan Ignacio Emme - strings

Production
Produced by byron and A&A Records
Mixed and mastered by Victor Panfilov at Real Sound & Vision

References

Byron (band) albums
2013 albums